Beaduheard was an Anglo-Saxon reeve who was based in Dorchester in Dorset, who in 789 became the first known person killed by a Viking raid in England.

Early life
Nothing is known of Beaduheard's early life, including where he was born or who his parents were. However, his name (Beaduheard means 'battle-hard') and position suggests that his family were of relatively high rank, from a martial background, and that he was over the age of 31, which is regarded as middle aged for the time. He was reeve during the reign of Beorhtric of Wessex, king of Wessex from 786 to 802.

Death
The Anglo-Saxon Chronicle for AD 789 reports:

787 [789] Here Beorhtric took King Offa's daughter Eadburh. And in his days came first 3 ships from Hordaland: and then the reeve rode there and wanted to compel them to go to the king's town because he did not know who they were; and then they killed him. These were the first ships of the Danish men which sought out the land of the English race.

Æthelweard's version of the Chronicle, known as the Chronicon Æthelweardi, a Latin translation of a lost version of the Anglo-Saxon Chronicle, goes into more detail. He tells us that the three ships landed at Portland and that when Beaduheard heard of their arrival he "leapt on his horse" and "sped to the harbour with a few men". He also claims that Beaduheard spoke to the arrivals in an "authoritative tone" and this is why they killed him.

Æthelweard was writing nearly 200 years after the event, sometime after 975 and probably before 983. His account is the first to name Beaduheard, however as his work was a Latin translation of a (now lost) Anglo-Saxon original, there is nothing to suggest that the name is incorrect.

Aftermath
Four years later, in 793, a major Viking raid took place on the monastery of Lindisfarne in the kingdom of Northumberland. This has commonly been regarded as the start of the Viking raids on Britain.

Notes

References

Anglo-Saxon England
Anglo-Saxons killed in battle
Anglo-Norse England
Wessex
Year of birth missing
787 deaths
8th-century English people
8th century in England